Kamdar is a surname. Notable people with the surname include:

Ahmad Amir Kamdar (born 1989), Iranian footballer
Raunaq Kamdar (born 1986), Indian actor
Zeenal Kamdar, Indian actress

Indian surnames